Henri Victor Vallois (11 April 1889 – 27 August 1981) was a French anthropologist and paleontologist. He was one of the editors in chief of the Revue d'Anthropologie from 1932 to 1970, and became director of the Musée de l'Homme in 1950.

Bibliography 
 Les hommes fossiles, éléments de paléontologie humaine, 1920
 Anthropologie de la population française, 1943
 Les races humaines, PUF, collection Que sais-je ?, 1944

See 
 Interview d'Henri Victor Vallois (pdf) por Jean-Pierre Bocquet-Appel (director de investigaciones de CNRS) 15 de febreo de 1981.

1889 births
1981 deaths
French anthropologists
20th-century anthropologists